Varyashbash (Wäräşbaş) is a rural locality (a village) in Novoartaulsky Selsoviet, Yanaulsky District, Bashkortostan, Russia. The population was 68 as of 2010. There is 1 street.

Geography 
Varyashbash is located 23 km north of Yanaul (the district's administrative centre) by road. Votskaya Oshya is the nearest rural locality.

References 

Rural localities in Yanaulsky District